Accident Investigation Branch or Accidents Investigation Branch may refer to:

 Air Accidents Investigation Branch, a British government agency that investigates aviation accidents, formerly known as the Accidents Investigation Branch
 Marine Accident Investigation Branch, a British government agency that investigates marine accidents
 Rail Accident Investigation Branch, a British government agency that investigates railway accidents

See also
 Accident Investigation Board (disambiguation)
 Accident Investigation Bureau (disambiguation)